Conasprella sargenti is a species of sea snail, a marine gastropod mollusk in the family Conidae, the cone snails, cone shells or cones.

References

 Petuch E. (2013) Biogeography and biodiversity of western Atlantic mollusks. CRC Press. 252 pp.
  Puillandre N., Duda T.F., Meyer C., Olivera B.M. & Bouchet P. (2015). One, four or 100 genera? A new classification of the cone snails. Journal of Molluscan Studies. 81: 1-23

External links
 To World Register of Marine Species
 

sargenti
Gastropods described in 2013